The 2013 Columbia Lions football team represented Columbia University in the 2013 NCAA Division I FCS football season. They were led by second year head coach Pete Mangurian and played their home games at Robert K. Kraft Field at Lawrence A. Wien Stadium. They were a member of the Ivy League. They finished with a record of 0–10 overall, 0–7 in Ivy League play for a last place finish. This was the sixth time in school history that the Columbia Lions went winless. Columbia averaged 5,610 fans per game.

Schedule

References

Columbia
College football winless seasons
Columbia Lions football seasons
Columbia Lions football